Morecambe is a seaside town in the City of Lancaster, Lancashire, England.  It contains 43 buildings that are recorded in the National Heritage List for England as designated listed buildings.  Of these, two are at Grade II*, the middle grade, and the others are at Grade II, the lowest grade.  The town originated as a small fishing village called Poulton, and started to be used as a resort towards the end of the 18th century.  It expanded during the 19th century, particularly following the arrival of the railway in 1850.  The town was officially renamed Morecambe in 1889.

The older listed buildings include some of those surviving from the earliest village, and include some former farmhouses and farm buildings that have been absorbed by the growing town.  There is a seafront terrace of varied houses dating from the early to mid-19th century.  Later listed buildings include public buildings, churches, two railway stations that have been converted into other uses, public houses, a theatre, a hotel, a former school, a clock tower, and a war memorial.

Key

Buildings

References

Citations

Sources

Lists of listed buildings in Lancashire
Buildings and structures in Morecambe